Malinao, officially the Municipality of Malinao (Aklanon: Banwa it Malinao; Hiligaynon: Banwa sang Malinao), is a 4th class municipality in the province of Aklan, Philippines. According to the 2020 census, it has a population of 24,517 people.

History

Once an arrabal of the town of Banga to the east, Malinao's town leaders in the mid-18th century were able to submit a petition of separation direct to Manila that was approved. In addition, Malinao rose to prominence in Philippine history during the struggle against colonial rule under Spain at the end of the 19th century. Candido Iban, a resident of Malinao, was a member of the inner circle of the original Katipuneros directly under Andres Bonifacio.

The people of Malinao are mainly of Malay stock. Aklanons are believed to be descendants of the settlers who fled the oppressive rule of Makatunaw, Sultan of Brunei. Led by Datu Puti, ten datus settled in the plains of the island of Panay. The colonization by the Spaniards, the trading by the Chinese have infused new blood to the original Malay race into what are now the people of Malinao.

There is no record of the history of Malinao until the 18th century. By this time, the area of what is now Malinao was part of the adjacent municipality of Banga. The Poblacion of Banga then was the Poblacion of Malinao today. In 1792, however, the town authorities transferred the Poblacion of Banga across the Aklan River at the foot of Manduyog Hill where it is now located.

Some prominent families decided to remain in the 'old town' which was reduced to the status of barrio and named Malinao - derived from the name of the placid river that traverses the western and southern portion of the area as it empties into the Aklan River.

The people who remained in Malinao led by Don Juan Nepomuceno agitated to separate the lands west of the Aklan River to form a new town with Malinao as its poblacion.

Malinao as a municipality came into being in the year 1796 with Don Casimiro Barrera as its first gobernadorcillo.

Little written history is known of Malinao in its early existence, except for church records on baptism which starts on the year 1796, the same year Malinao became a town. The Spanish decree on change family names for easy identification of inhabitants led to the assignment of the initial letter 'Y'/ 'I' for families originating from Malinao.

By the close of the 19th century, the political, economic and even the physical structure of Malinao conform to the classical colonial and feudal set-up existing throughout Christian Philippines. The layout of the Poblacion follows the classical Spanish town plan of the church facing the municipio with the plaza in between and streets laid out in grid pattern. The principalia partook of choice residential lots around the plaza. Their importance and influence reflected in the proximity of their lots to the center of power.

There was no concentration of land holdings by few families, unlike in other areas of the country. Original families in Malinao have their own pieces of land to work on. The land west of the Aklan River, because of its topography, must have escaped the encomienderos and hacienderos in the early part of Spanish colonization.

Despite its seeming ordinariness and unimportance in the national or provincial scheme of things, Malinao rose in prominence during the struggle against colonial rule at the end of the 19th century.

A native of Lilo-an, Malinao, Candido Iban was a member of the inner circle of the original Katipuneros directly under Andres Bonifacio. Candido Iban was the first overseas contract worker from Malinao, diving for pearls in Australia. As luck would have it, he won a considerable sum in a lottery and came back to Manila. He was befriended by Procopio Bonifacio, the brother of Andres, and was inducted as a Katipunero by Andres in the caves of Montalban. The first printing press of the Katipunan was paid for the lottery winnings of Candido Iban.

In 1897, Candido Iban and Francisco Castillo were sent to Aklan to organize the Katipunan in the Visayas. Barrio Lilo-an became the base of the katipunan. And in 1897, believing that the time was ripe for the start of the revolution, eighty-two (82) Katipuneros from Lilo-an marched to the Poblacion to persuade the local authorities to join the revolution. The uprising failed and the leaders captured. Candido Iban, Benito Iban and Gabino Yonsal were among the 19 Martyrs of Aklan executed by the Spanish authorities on March 23, 1897.

A monument of Candido Iban and the failed uprising called El Levantamiento de los 82 de Lilo-an stands prominently beside the town hall.

When the Japanese Imperial Army invaded the country during World War II, young men from Malinao were among the first to organize the guerrilla movement in this part of the country. During the Marcos dictatorship, many young Malinaonons took up arms to fight it.

The leadership of the town since the Spanish regime always come from the leading families of the Poblacion. From Juan Nepomuceno in 1792 to Atty. Wilbert Ariel Igoy in 2016, this leadership reflect the political and economic clout of the leading families. Leaders were appointed by Spanish authorities during the Spanish period. When democratic election were started during the American colonial regime, the leading families divided into two factions, each vying for leadership of the town. Whether it is the Nationalista Party or Liberal Party, KBL or Laban, Puersa ng Masa or Lakas, these politicos come from these two factions.

Geography

According to the Philippine Statistics Authority, the municipality has a land area of  constituting  of the  total area of Aklan.

Climate

Barangays
Malinao is politically subdivided into 23 barangays.

Demographics

In the 2020 census, Malinao had a population of 25,845.

Economy

References

External links
 [ Philippine Standard Geographic Code]
 
 Malinao Gallery

Municipalities of Aklan